Umbilical ligament may refer to:

Median umbilical ligament (Ligamentum umbilicale medianum)
Medial umbilical ligament (Ligamentum umbilicale mediale)
Lateral umbilical fold or lateral umbilical ligament